Green Suede Shoes is an album by the American Celtic rock band Black 47, released in 1996. It was a commercial disappointment. 

The title track was the album's first single.

Production
The album was produced by frontman Larry Kirwan. It dispensed with some of the stylistic range found on previous albums, focusing more on the Irish aspects of the group's sound; one song is sung in Gaelic.

"Rory" is a tribute to the late Rory Gallagher. "Green Suede Shoes" is a semi-autobiographical song about a rock band; Kirwan later used the title for his autobiography.

Critical reception

The Knoxville News Sentinel called the album "a rehash of the Black 47 shtick," writing that Kirwan "becomes ludicrous with his overdramatic storytelling." The Chicago Tribune wrote that the band "again adorns its rousing tales of political martyrs and working-class louts with Celtic flourishes, reggae rhythms and punchy hard rock." The Santa Fe New Mexican noted that the band "is often put down as a watered-down Pogues," but praised "Forty Deuce" as "a chilling story about modern Irish-American gangsters."

The Indianapolis Star stated that "Black 47 blends more styles of music than perhaps any other band out there today ... But it works." The Los Angeles Times thought that "Kirwan brings a theatrical literacy and creativity to the table ... tales deal with the larger than life, the idealistic rather than the hedonistic." USA Today concluded that "unlike many pop prophets, the band conveys its agenda in keen storytelling and intoxicating tunes."

AllMusic wrote that "the band cooks simply and mightily, goosing the traditional jigs and reels that make up most of its melodic repertoire with R&B, hip-hop and reggae riddims." Dave Thompson called the album "a neglected classic, the Pogues go posh."

Track listing

References

1996 albums
Mercury Records albums